The UEFA European Women's Championship, also called the UEFA Women's Euro, held every four years, is the main competition in women's association football between national teams of the UEFA confederation. The competition is the women's equivalent of the UEFA European Championship. The reigning champions are England, who won their home tournament in 2022. The most successful nation in the history of the tournament is Germany, with eight titles.

History
 In 1957 in West Berlin, a European Championship was staged by the International Ladies Football Association. Four teams, representing West Germany, the Netherlands, Austria, and the eventual winners, England, played the tournament at the Poststadion, at a time when women's football teams were officially forbidden by the German Football Association, a ban that was widely defied.

The FICF, which eventually merged into the Italian Football Federation, organised a European tournament in Italy in 1969 for women's national teams, a tournament won by the home team, Italy, who beat Denmark 3–1 in the final. The two nations were also the finalists of the 1970 Women's World Cup in Italy.

Italy hosted another European women's tournament a decade later, the 1979 European Competition for Women's Football – won by Denmark.

UEFA displayed little enthusiasm for women's football and were particularly hostile to Italy's independent women's football federation. Sue Lopez, a member of England's squad, contended that a lack of female representation in UEFA was a contributory factor:

At a conference on 19 February 1980 UEFA resolved to launch its own competition for women's national teams. The meeting minutes had registered the 1979 competition as a "cause for concern". The first UEFA-run international tournament began only in 1982, when the 1984 European Competition for Women's Football qualification was launched. The 1984 Finals were won by Sweden. Norway won the 1987 Finals. Since then, the UEFA Women's Championship has been dominated by Germany, which has won eight out of ten events. Norway won in 1993 and the Netherlands in 2017. Germany's 2013 win had been their sixth in a row. In 2022, England won UEFA Women's Euro 2022, becoming the country's first senior association football team of either gender to win a major tournament since the men's team won the 1966 FIFA World Cup.

The tournament was initially played as a four-team event. The 1997 edition was the first that was played with eight teams. The third expansion happened in 2009 when 12 teams participated. From 2017 onwards 16 teams compete for the championship.

The first three tournaments of the UEFA competition in the 1980s had the name "European Competition for Representative Women's Teams". With UEFA's increasing acceptance of women's football, this competition was given European Championship status by UEFA around 1990. Only the 1991 and 1995 editions have been used as European qualifiers for a FIFA Women's World Cup; starting in 1999, women's national teams adopted the separate World Cup qualifying competition and group system used in men's qualifiers.

Results

Summary

 * hosts 
 1 named West Germany until 1990

Medal table

In the 1987, 1989, 1991 and 1993 tournaments there was a third place playoff. Since 1995, both losing semi-finalists are counted as bronze. Only Norway and Germany have won multiple titles.

Debut of teams

Overall team records
In this ranking 3 points are awarded for a win, 1 for a draw and 0 for a loss. As per statistical convention in football, matches decided in extra time are counted as wins and losses, while matches decided by penalty shoot-outs are counted as draws. Teams are ranked by total points, then by goal difference, then by goals scored.

Team results by tournament
Legend
 – Champions
 – Runners-up
 – Third place (not determined after 1993)
 – Fourth place (not determined after 1993)
 – Semi-finals (since 1995)
 – Quarter-finals (since 2009)
GS – Group stage
Q – Qualified for upcoming tournament
 – Did not qualify
 – Did not enter / Withdrew / Banned
 – Hosts

For each tournament, the number of teams in each finals tournament (in brackets) are shown.

Hosts

Results of defending finalists

Tournament statistics

All-time top scorers

Top scorers by tournament

UEFA.com Golden Player by tournament

1Official player of the tournament since 2013

Highest attendances
87,192 – England v Germany, Wembley, London (2022 final)
68,871 – England v Austria, Old Trafford, Manchester (2022 group stage)
41,301 – Germany v Norway, Friends Arena, Solna (2013 final)
30,785 - England v Northern Ireland, St Mary's Stadium, Southampton (2022 group stage)
29,092 – England v Finland, City of Manchester Stadium, Manchester (2005 group stage)
28,994 – England v Spain, Falmer Stadium, Brighton and Hove (2022 quarter-final) 
28,847 – England v Norway, Falmer Stadium, Brighton and Hove (2022 group stage)
28,624 – England v Sweden, Bramall Lane, Sheffield (2022 semi-final) 
28,182 – Netherlands v Denmark, De Grolsch Veste, Enschede (2017 final)
27,445 – Germany v France, Stadium MK, Milton Keynes (2022 semi-final)

See also

 UEFA Women's Champions League
 UEFA Women's Under-19 Championship
 UEFA Women's Under-17 Championship
 FIFA Women's World Cup
 FIFA U-17 Women's World Cup
 FIFA U-20 Women's World Cup

Notes

References

External links

 UEFA Women's Championship
 BBC Sport – "How Women's Euros have evolved"

 
UEFA competitions for women's national teams
European championships
Recurring sporting events established in 1984